Pecora is an infraorder of even-toed hoofed mammals with ruminant digestion. Most members of Pecora have cranial appendages projecting from their frontal bones; only two extant genera lack them, Hydropotes and Moschus. The name “Pecora” comes from the Latin word pecus, which means “horned livestock”. Although most pecorans have cranial appendages, only some of these are properly called “horns”, and many scientists agree that these appendages did not arise from a common ancestor, but instead evolved independently on at least two occasions. Likewise, while Pecora as a group is supported by both molecular and morphological studies, morphological support for interrelationships between pecoran families is disputed.

Evolutionary history 
The first fossil ruminants appeared in the Early Eocene and were small, likely omnivorous, forest-dwellers. Artiodactyls with cranial appendages first occur in the early Miocene. The appearance of Pecora during the Miocene suggests that its rapid diversification may correspond to the climate change events of that epoch.

It is likely that the antelopes, giraffids, and pronghorns evolved in an open environment while the cervids, including the caribou, evolved in a woodland habitat. The type of gallop in Pecorian species is shown to be closely related to their environment and anatomy, where light Pecorian species use both flexed and extended suspensions in their fast gallops. The white-tail and mule-deer have been observed to primarily use the extended suspension, since in this phase of their gallop they leap over bushes and logs that are present in their brush environment. However, heavy Pecorian species do not use extended suspensions as most have backs that slope downward with shorter hind legs.

Taxonomy and Classification 
Pecora is an infraorder within the larger suborder Ruminantia, and is the sister clade to the infraorder Tragulina (of which Tragulidae is the only surviving family).

Pecora's placement within Artiodactyla can be represented in the following cladogram:

Current attempts to determine the relationships among pecoran families (as well as all artiodactyls) rely on molecular studies, as little consensus exists in morphological studies. Different families within Pecora are recognized as valid by different groups of scientists.and sources therein, pp. 4–5

Until the beginning of the 21st century it was understood that the family Moschidae (musk deer) was sister to Cervidae. However, a 2003 phylogenetic study by Alexandre Hassanin (of National Museum of Natural History, France) and colleagues, based on mitochondrial and nuclear analyses, revealed that Moschidae and Bovidae form a clade sister to Cervidae. According to the study, Cervidae diverged from the Bovidae-Moschidae clade 27 to 28 million years ago. The following cladogram is based on the 2003 study.

Infraorder Pecora ("horned ruminants", "higher ruminants")
 Family †Gelocidae
 Family †Palaeomerycidae
 Family Cervidae (deer)
 Family Moschidae (musk deer)
 Family Bovidae (cattle, goats, sheep, and antelopes)
 Superfamily Giraffoidea
 Family Antilocapridae (pronghorn)
 Family Giraffidae (giraffe, okapi)
 Family †Climacoceratidae

Anatomy 
Pecorans share characteristics with other artiodactyls, including a four-chambered stomach, and a paraxonic foot, meaning that it supports weight on the third and fourth digits. Several characteristics distinguish Pecora from its sister taxon, Tragulina: an astragalus with parallel sides, a loss of the trapezium, and differences in parts of the skull such as the petrosal bone.

The distinguishing features of most pecoran families are cranial appendages. Most modern pecorans (with the exception of the Moschidae) have one of four types of cranial appendages: horns, antlers, ossicones, or pronghorns.

 True horns have a bone core that is covered in a permanent sheath of keratin. They are indicative of Bovidae. Horns develop in the periosteum over the frontal bone, and can be curved or straight. Surface features on the keratin sheath (e.g., ridges or twists) are thought to be caused by differential rates of growth around the bone core.
 Antlers are bony structures that are shed and replaced each year in members of the family Cervidae. They grow from a permanent outgrowth of the frontal bone called the pedicle. Antlers can be branched, as in the white-tailed deer (Odocoileus virginianus), or palmate, as in the moose (Alces alces).
 Ossicones are permanent bone structures that fuse to the frontal or parietal bones during the lifetime of an animal. They are found only in the Giraffidae and closely related extinct clades, represented in modern animals by the giraffe (Giraffa camelopardalis) and the okapi (Okapia johnstoni).
 Pronghorns are similar to horns in that they have keratinous sheaths covering permanent bone cores; however, these sheaths are deciduous and can be shed like antlers. Very little is known about the development of pronghorns, but they are generally presumed to have evolved independently. The only extant animal with pronghorns is the pronghorn antelope (Antilocapra americana).

References

External links 
 

 
Ruminants
Extant Burdigalian first appearances